Wayne Gretzky Hockey is an ice hockey-themed sports game developed by Bethesda Softworks, and first published in 1988.

Gameplay
The game features the name and likeness of Canadian professional ice hockey centre Wayne Gretzky.

Release
Bethesda Softworks published Wayne Gretzky Hockey shortly after Peter Pocklington traded Gretzky from the Edmonton Oilers to the Los Angeles Kings on August 9, 1988.

Bethesda Softworks followed the game with two sequels: Wayne Gretzky Hockey 2 (1990) and Wayne Gretzky Hockey 3 (1992).

Reception

Sales of Wayne Gretzky Hockey reached 350,000 units by 1995, which "put Bethesda Softworks on the gaming map", according to PC Gamer US.

In the April 1989 edition of Computer Gaming World, Johnny Wilson gave an "unhesitating recommendation" of the game "to anyone who enjoys hockey".

In the January 1990 edition  of Games International (Issue 12), Mike Siggins found the arcade version of the game uninspiring, and the strategy game only a bit better. He concluded by giving the game 3 out of 5 for game play and 4 out of 5 for graphics, saying, "It is among the best hockey games around but sadly, given the earlier efforts in this field, that is not saying much [...] It is neither a good arcade game or stats based game, while it attempts to do both."

In 1996, Computer Gaming World declared Wayne Gretzky Hockey the 111th-best computer game ever released.

See also
Wayne Gretzky's 3D Hockey (1996)

References

1988 video games
Amiga games
Atari ST games
THQ games
Bethesda Softworks games
Gretzky, Wayne Hockey
DOS games
Ice hockey video games
Classic Mac OS games
Nintendo Entertainment System games
Video games scored by Julian Le Fay
Video games developed in the United States